Daniel James McKee (born June 16, 1951) is an American politician and businessman serving as the 76th governor of Rhode Island since March 2021. A member of the Democratic Party, he also served as Rhode Island's 69th lieutenant governor from 2015 to 2021.

Born in Cumberland, Rhode Island, McKee received his undergraduate degree from Assumption College and his Master's degree from the Harvard Kennedy School. He served on the Cumberland town council from 1992 to 1998 and as mayor of Cumberland twice, from 2000 to 2004 and from 2006 until 2014. McKee was elected lieutenant governor in 2014. When Governor Gina Raimondo resigned upon being confirmed as United States Secretary of Commerce in 2021, McKee ascended to the governorship. He was elected to a full term in 2022.

Early life
McKee's family has owned and operated small businesses in northern Rhode Island for over 100 years. After graduating from Cumberland High School, McKee received a Bachelor of Arts in education and political science from Assumption College in Worcester, Massachusetts in 1973. He earned a Master of Public Administration from the Harvard Kennedy School in 2005.

Early career
McKee was an officer of McKee Brothers, a heating, air conditioning, and home heating oil delivery business his grandfather founded. He also ran a health and fitness business for more than 30 years.

During his time on the Cumberland, Rhode Island Town Council (1992–1998), McKee was also a basketball coach, coaching groups of boys and girls at all levels, culminating in two State AAU Basketball Champions in 1998 and 2000.

McKee served six terms as Cumberland's mayor. He worked with state and federal officials in the aftermath of Cumberland's historic spring flooding to minimize the damage and steered Cumberland through Rhode Island's unprecedented economic downturn.

In 2008, McKee worked with mayors across the state to pass a law allowing the creation of new, regional, mayor-governed and highly autonomous public schools known as “Mayoral Academies.” In 2009 and 2010, he again helped organize mayors and education advocates to enact a new education funding policy.

McKee has been a member of the board of directors of the Boys and Girls Club of Cumberland-Lincoln for over 25 years, serving as past president of the executive board and chair of the endowment committee.

Lieutenant governor of Rhode Island
In 2013, McKee announced his candidacy for Rhode island lieutenant governor, defeating Secretary of State of Rhode Island Ralph Mollis and State Representative Frank Ferri in the Democratic primary. In the general election, he defeated Republican Catherine Terry Taylor, a legislative aide and speechwriter for U.S. Senators John Chafee and Lincoln Chafee, with 54.3% of the vote. He was reelected in 2018.

On January 7, 2021, President-elect Joe Biden selected Rhode Island Governor Gina Raimondo as Secretary of Commerce. Since McKee was next in line of succession, he would become governor once Raimondo was confirmed by the United States Senate. She was confirmed on March 2, 2021, and submitted her resignation as governor shortly after.

In February 2021, McKee began to form a COVID-19 advisory board. He had criticized the Raimondo administration over a slow COVID-19 vaccine rollout.

Governor of Rhode Island

McKee was sworn in as the 76th governor of Rhode Island on March 2, 2021. On February 22, 2022, McKee announced that he was running for reelection to a full four-year term. He won the September 13 Democratic primary, defeating four challengers in a close race. He defeated Republican nominee Ashley Kalus in the general election.

Response to the COVID-19 pandemic (2021–2022)

In 2021, during the COVID-19 pandemic in the United States, McKee said his main priority was to advance COVID-19 vaccine rollout and contain the outbreak. By July 4, Rhode Island had fully vaccinated over 633,000 people, 70% of its eligible adult population. It was the fifth state to reach that milestone. Also in July, McKee terminated the state mask mandate, but extended the COVID-19 emergency declaration to August 6, citing the prevalence of the highly transmissible Delta variant.

On February 8, 2022, McKee announced that Rhode Island would lift mask mandates as the infection rate fell.

Statewide reclassification of drug possession charges 
In September 2021, McKee signed legislation that reclassified simple possession of 10 grams or less of certain controlled substances as a misdemeanor rather than a felony in Rhode Island. He signed the legislation at Project Weber/RENEW's office.

Personal life 
McKee is married to Susan McGill; the couple has two children and one granddaughter.

Electoral history

Mayor of Cumberland

Lieutenant Governor

Governor

References

External links

 Governor Dan McKee official government website
 McKee for Governor campaign website

|-

|-

|-

|-

|-

1951 births
20th-century American businesspeople
20th-century American politicians
21st-century American politicians
Assumption University (Worcester) alumni
Businesspeople from Rhode Island
Democratic Party governors of Rhode Island
Harvard Kennedy School alumni
Lieutenant Governors of Rhode Island
Living people
Mayors of places in Rhode Island
People from Cumberland, Rhode Island
Rhode Island city council members